Below the Line is a 1925 American silent drama film featuring canine star Rin Tin Tin and directed by Herman C. Raymaker. It was produced and distributed by Warner Bros.

Plot
As described in a film magazine review, a police dog is shipped South to a sheriff, but en route he jumps from the train and is taken in charge by a man who later sells him to another man. He who first had the dog enters the home of the second man to rob it, but the dog kills him. The dead man’s brother sets bloodhounds on the trail of the hero, and he and his finance are tracked down. The police dog goes to their rescue.

Cast

Box office
According to Warner Bros records, the film earned $235,000 domestically and $33,000 foreign.

Preservation status
There is extant an abridged / incomplete copy of Below the Line in a private collector's possession. It was transferred onto 16mm film by Associated Artists Productions in the 1950s and shown on television.

References

External links

Lobby or window card

1925 films
American silent feature films
Warner Bros. films
1925 drama films
American black-and-white films
Rin Tin Tin
Films directed by Herman C. Raymaker
1920s American films